W with acute (majuscule: Ẃ, minuscule: ẃ) is a letter of the Latin alphabet formed by addition of the acute diacritic over the letter W. In the past, it was used in Lower Sorbian and Middle Polish. Now it is used in the Welsh orthography as an accented form of w, e. g. gẃraidd 'manly'.

Usage 
The letter appeared in the alphabet made by Jan Kochanowski for Middle Polish, that was used from 16th until 18th century. It represented the palatalizated voiced labiodental fricative (vʲ) sound. It also was used in Lower Sorbian.

Encoding

References

Bibliography 
Georg Kral, Grammatik der Wendischen Sprache in der Oberlausitz, Bautzen, M. Schmaler, 1895.
Josef Páta, Krátká příručka hornolužické srbštiny stručná mluvnice, rozhovory a korespondence, Praze, Adolf Černy, 1920.
C. T. Pfuhl, Laut- und Formenlehre der oberlausitzisch-wendischen Sprache : mit besonderer Rücksicht auf das Altslawische, Bautzen, M. Schmaler, 1895.

Latin letters with diacritics
Polish letters with diacritics